Cameron Bailey is a Canadian film critic and festival programmer, who is the CEO of the Toronto International Film Festival (TIFF).

Biography
Born in London, England to parents from Barbados, he spent his early childhood in St. James, Barbados, before moving to Canada with his family at the age of eight. Educated at the University of Western Ontario, he worked as a film reviewer for Now, Canada AM, CBC Radio One, Take One and other publications before joining the Toronto International Film Festival as a programmer.

He also co-wrote the screenplay for the 1997 film The Planet of Junior Brown with Clement Virgo, and wrote and directed the short film Hotel Saudade.

In 2012, Bailey was named artistic director of the Toronto International Film Festival.

He participated in the 2015 edition of Canada Reads, where he advocated for Kim Thúy's novel Ru. Ru ultimately won the competition.

In 2018, Bailey was promoted to the newly created position of artistic director and co-head of the Toronto International Film Festival. In 2021, following the resignation of co-head Joana Vicente, Bailey was named the festival's executive director.

On November 30, 2021 Bailey was appointed Chief Executive Officer of TIFF after a 25 year career with the festival.

Selected publications

 In this essay he honoured Jennifer Hodge de Silva.

References

External links

Canadian film critics
Film directors from Toronto
Film producers from Ontario
20th-century Canadian screenwriters
Black Canadian writers
Barbadian emigrants to Canada
University of Western Ontario alumni
Writers from Toronto
Toronto International Film Festival people
Living people
20th-century Canadian non-fiction writers
Film festival directors
Year of birth missing (living people)
Canadian male screenwriters